Central venous pressure (CVP) is the blood pressure in the venae cavae, near the right atrium of the heart. CVP reflects the amount of blood returning to the heart and the ability of the heart to pump the blood back into the arterial system. CVP is often a good approximation of right atrial pressure (RAP), although the two terms are not identical, as a pressure differential can sometimes exist between the venae cavae and the right atrium. CVP and RAP can differ when arterial tone is altered. This can be graphically depicted as changes in the slope of the venous return plotted against right atrial pressure (where central venous pressure increases, but right atrial pressure stays the same; VR = CVP − RAP).

CVP has been, and often still is, used as a surrogate for preload, and changes in CVP in response to infusions of intravenous fluid have been used to predict volume-responsiveness (i.e. whether more fluid will improve cardiac output). However, there is increasing evidence that CVP, whether as an absolute value or in terms of changes in response to fluid, does not correlate with ventricular volume (i.e. preload) or volume-responsiveness, and so should not be used to guide intravenous fluid therapy.  Nevertheless, CVP monitoring is a useful tool to guide hemodynamic therapy.  
The cardiopulmonary baroreflex responds to an increase in CVP by decreasing systemic vascular resistance while increasing heart rate and ventricular contractility in dogs.

Measurement

Normal CVP in patients can be measured from two points of reference:

Sternum: 0–14 cm H2O
Midaxillary line: 8–15 cm H2O

CVP can be measured by connecting the patient's central venous catheter to a special infusion set which is connected to a small diameter water column. If the water column is calibrated properly the height of the column indicates the CVP.

In most intensive care units, facilities are available to measure CVP continuously.

Normal values vary between 4 and 12 cmH2O.

Factors affecting CVP

Factors that increase CVP include:
Cardiac tamponade
Decreased cardiac output
Forced exhalation
Heart failure
Hypervolemia
Mechanical ventilation and the application of positive end-expiratory pressure (PEEP)
Pleural effusion
Pulmonary embolism
Pulmonary hypertension
Tension pneumothorax

Factors that decrease CVP include:
Deep inhalation
Distributive shock
Hypovolemia

See also
Jugular venous pressure
Pulmonary capillary wedge pressure

References

External links
Venous function and central venous pressure: a physiologic story - a technical discussion of the more modern understanding of central venous pressure; this may well conflict with the sources below.
Central Venous Pressure and Pulmonary Capillary Wedge Monitoring
Cardiovascular Physiology

Medical terminology
Medical monitoring
Cardiovascular physiology